Nicole Bresnehan (born 25 March 1997) is an Australian rules footballer playing for the North Melbourne Football Club in the AFL Women's competition (AFLW). Bresnehan was drafted by North Melbourne with the club's fifth selection and the 63rd pick overall in the 2018 AFL Women's draft. It was reported that she signed on with the club for one more season on 17 June 2021, tying her to the club until the end of 2022.

References

External links 

1997 births
Living people
North Melbourne Football Club (AFLW) players
Australian rules footballers from Tasmania